Steve Gilbert (born c. 1957) is an American former college football coach. He served as the head football coach at Ursinus College in Collegeville, Pennsylvania from 1988 to 1996 and Jacksonville University in Jacksonville, Florida from 1998 to 2006, compiling a career college football coaching record of 76–102. Gilbert was the first head coach in the history of the Jacksonville Dolphins football program.

Gilbert played college football at West Chester University. He was an assistant coach at the University of Pennsylvania and then offensive coordinator at Washington University in St. Louis for four seasons before he was hired as head football coach at Ursinus in 1988.

Head coaching record

References

Year of birth uncertain
1950s births
Living people
Jacksonville Dolphins football coaches
Penn Quakers football coaches
Ursinus Bears football coaches
Washington University Bears football coaches
West Chester Golden Rams football players